Partners & Napier (stylized as Partners + Napier) is an advertising agency headquartered in Rochester, New York. The agency has additional field offices in New York and San Francisco.

History
Partners & Napier was created in 2004 when CEO Sharon Napier and three partners, including CFO Jim DiNoto and CCO Jeff Gabel, purchased the Rochester, New York and Atlanta, Georgia offices of Wolf Group Integrated Communications, an agency based in Toronto, Ontario; the three were all Rochester-based regional executives with Wolf Group who took action when founder and chairman Larry Wolf decided to shut down the firm.

The agency is the founding member of the Partners Group, an interdependent collective of North American agencies formed in 2006, consisting of Partners & Napier, Partners and Jeary and Partners and Edell. The collective was dissolved after Partners and Jeary and Partners and Edell were acquired.

In 2011, Partners & Napier was acquired by Project Worldwide, a holding company consisting of thirteen agencies based in Auburn Hills, Michigan.

References

External links
Official Website
Comrade Advertising
Organic and Local SEO

Companies based in New York (state)
Companies based in Rochester, New York
Advertising agencies of the United States